Richard Alan Mohr Jr. (July 27, 1959 – June 6, 2021) was a Canadian football defensive lineman in the Canadian Football League who played for the Toronto Argonauts and Saskatchewan Roughriders. He played college football for the UC Davis Aggies from 1977 to 1980. After college, he signed as a free agent with the Green Bay Packers. He also played in the USFL for the Oakland Invaders and Tampa Bay Bandits.

Mohr died on June 6, 2021 after a heart attack while golfing in Carmel, California at the age of 61.

References

1959 births
2021 deaths
American football defensive linemen
Canadian football defensive linemen
Toronto Argonauts players
Saskatchewan Roughriders players
Oakland Invaders players
Tampa Bay Bandits players
UC Davis Aggies football players